Richard Werner Bokelmann (October 26, 1926 – December 27, 2019) was an American Major League Baseball pitcher who played for the St. Louis Cardinals from 1951 to 1953, making a total of 34 appearances, which included one start.

Bokelmann died December 27, 2019.

References

External links

1926 births
2019 deaths
People from Arlington Heights, Illinois
Baseball players from Illinois
Major League Baseball pitchers
St. Louis Cardinals players
Columbus Red Birds players
Fresno Cardinals players
Allentown Cardinals players
Omaha Cardinals players
Houston Buffaloes players
Rochester Red Wings players
Tulsa Oilers (baseball) players